Fawzi Merhi (born 20 June 1950) is a Lebanese épée, foil and sabre fencer. He competed in four events at the 1972 Summer Olympics.

References

External links
 

1950 births
Living people
Lebanese male épée fencers
Olympic fencers of Lebanon
Fencers at the 1972 Summer Olympics
Lebanese male foil fencers
Lebanese male sabre fencers